The Media Wave International Film Festival (Mediawave Nemzetközi Filmfesztivál) also known as Fényírók Fesztiválja is one of the significant International Visual Arts festival held in Hungary. It was founded in 1991. The festival presents all Visual arts platforms including feature films, shorts, documentaries, and animated films. All programs, screenings, conferences, and exhibitions are free to attend.

History
The first edition was held as "International Film And Video Art Festival" of Hungary, and The festival uses the name "Fényírók Fesztiválja" since 1994 onwards. The Festival is also known as Media Wave, Festival of Light Writer and On the Road International Online Film Festival.

Fesztivál Fődíja (Main Prize) winners of the Media Wave
The Main Prize is offered by: Hungarian Motion Picture Public Foundation for the Best Ethnographic or Anthropological film.

Legjobb játékfilm (Best Feature Film) winners of the Media Wave

International Film Competition Awards
The Main Prize
Best Feature Film
Best Animation Film
Best Hungarian Experimental Film
KODAK – Hungary Award for Cinematography
The festival's documentary award
Győr City Award for the best animated film
Best Actor Award
Best Actress Award
Best Direction Award
Big Game Film Award
Best Dance Award
The jury's special award
Special Prizes

References

Further reading

External links

 Official website

1991 establishments in Hungary
Awards established in 1991
Film festivals established in 1991
April events
Cinema of Hungary
Media Wave Award winners
Festivals in Hungary
Film festivals in Hungary